The Serie B 1946–47 championship was organized by the Lega Calcio with geographical criteria: for this reason the three groups have different numbers of participants.

Teams
26 clubs had variously qualified for this championship, following the results of both 1942–43 and 1945–46 seasons. However, war damages and political choices imposed to divide the old Serie B between Northern and Southern Italy. Consequently, 20 Northern clubs from the previous Serie B-C and 14 selected teams from Southern Italy were added.

Events
To reduce the fixtures to 34 matchdays they following season, four teams per group and an additional club from Northern Italy had to be relegated.

Three groups were created: North-West, North-East and South. The group with 22 clubs was a record in the Italian football history.

Group A

Final classification

Results

Relegation tie-breaker
Played in Legnano on July 13:

Biellese qualified for the Northern Italy relegation play-off while Vogherese remained in Serie B.

Group B

Final classification

Results

Relegation tie-breaker
Played in Modena on July 13:

Pisa was saved while Anconitana qualified for the Northern Italy relegation play-off.

Group C

Final classification

Results

Northern Italy relegation play-off
When the Football League rejected in autumn 1946 the planned reduction of the Serie A, wild cards for two places in Serie B were given to the FIGC. US Cagliari joined after the end of the US occupation of Sardinia. Extraordinary match to fill the last place was organized.

Played in Bologna on August 31:

Biellese relegated to Serie C while Anconitana was re-admitted to Serie B.

Footnotes

References and sources
 Almanacco Illustrato del Calcio - La Storia 1898-2004, Panini Edizioni, Modena, September 2005

Serie B seasons
2
Italy